Suwałki Landscape Park (Suwalski Park Krajobrazowy) is a protected area (Landscape Park) in north-eastern Poland, established in 1976, covering an area of .

The area of the park is 6337.66 ha, of which approximately 60% is arable land, 10% water, 24% forests and trees, 4% marshy areas, 2% other land. The lagging of the park covers 9306.24 ha.

The Park lies within Podlaskie Voivodeship, in Suwałki County (Gmina Jeleniewo, Gmina Przerośl, Gmina Rutka-Tartak, Gmina Wiżajny).

Within the Landscape Park are three nature reserves.

Landscape parks in Poland
Parks in Podlaskie Voivodeship